Anteris is a genus of wasps in the family Platygastridae. There are about 15 described species in Anteris.

Anteris is a member of the subfamily Scelioninae. The subfamilies Scelioninae, Teleasinae, and Telenominae were formerly in the family Scelionidae, but Scelionidae was combined with the family Platygastridae because of genetic similarities. The name Platygastridae was retained for the resulting family because of seniority.

Species
These 15 species belong to the genus Anteris:

References

Further reading

 

Parasitic wasps
Scelioninae